During a genocide, a rescuer or helper is someone who tries to help the genocide victims survive. In many cases, they are motivated by altruism and/or humanitarianism. The best-studied example of this phenomenon is the rescue of Jews during the Holocaust.

See also

 Perpetrators, victims, and bystanders
 Rescue of Roma during the Porajmos

References

Further reading
 Bibliography of Genocide studies

Genocide studies
Altruism